Bandol is a commune in Var department, Provence-Alpes-Côte d'Azur region, southeastern France. Bandol and the seat of its eponymous commune, was founded in 1595 and built around a small military fort.

The Bandol wine region, located near the coast east of Marseille and Cassis, is one of Provence's most internationally recognized wine regions. Built around the village of Bandol, west of Toulon, the Bandol AOC covers the production of 8 communes with silicon & limestone soils. Those soils and the warm, coastal climate are ideally suited for the late ripening Mourvèdre grape which is the major variety of the region. For both the red and rosé wines, Mourvèdre must account for at least 50% of the blend, though most producers will use significantly more, with Grenache and Cinsaut usually filling out the rest of the wine's composition.

Population

Notable people
 Alain Bombard, scientist
 Alexander Lévy (born 1990), professional golfer
 Louis Lumière, cinematographer
 Paul Ricard, businessman
 Jacques Torres, pastry chef
 Jonny Wilkinson, rugby player

International relations
Bandol is twinned with:
 Nettuno, Italy
 Onex, Switzerland
 Wehr, Germany

See also
 Communes of the Var department
 Bandol (wine)
 Island of Bendor

References

Communes of Var (department)
1595 establishments in France